Clayton Township may refer to one of the following places in the State of Illinois:

Clayton Township, Adams County, Illinois
Clayton Township, Woodford County, Illinois

See also

Clayton Township (disambiguation)

Illinois township disambiguation pages